Malas may refer to:

 Malas language, a dialect of the Papuan Manep language
 Mala (caste), an ethnic group from the Indian states of Andhra Pradesh, Telangana and Karnataka

Places
 Málaš, a village and municipality in Levice District, Nitra Region, Slovakia
 Malas River, a river in Papua New Guinea

People

Given name
 Malas Abdulkarim al-Kasnazani (fl. 2014–2015), Iraqi politician and government minister

Surname
 Khaled Malas (born 1981), Syrian architect and an art historian
 Mohammad Malas, (born 1945) Syrian filmmaker
 Spiro Malas (1933–2019), Greek-American bass-baritone opera singer and actor
 Stavros Malas (born 1967), Cypriot politician
 Ewa Malas-Godlewska (born 1957), Polish soprano opera singer

Others
 Malas or Buddhist prayer beads
 Malas (Ayurveda), the waste products of the body in Ayurveda
 Malas Compañías, a 1980 album by Spanish singer-songwriter Joaquín Sabina
 A world in the online game Ultima Online

See also
Mala (disambiguation)